is a former Japanese football player.

Playing career
Nakamura was born in Tokyo on October 17, 1979. After graduating from high school, he joined J1 League club Kashima Antlers in 1998. Although he played several matches as left side back every season, he could not play many matches behind Naoki Soma. In early 2001, he played many matches as regular player because Soma got hurt in December 2000. However the club gained Augusto and he moved to J2 League club Oita Trinita in August 2001. At Trinita, he played as regular player. In 2002, he moved to J1 club Sanfrecce Hiroshima. However he could hardly play in the match. In 2003, he moved to J2 club Sagan Tosu. He played as regular player in 2 seasons. In 2005, he moved to Regional Leagues club Ain Foods. In 2008, he moved to Prefectural Leagues club Nara Club. The club was promoted to Regional Leagues from 2009. He retired end of 2010 season.

Club statistics

References

External links

biglobe.ne.jp

1979 births
Living people
Association football people from Tokyo
Japanese footballers
J1 League players
J2 League players
Kashima Antlers players
Oita Trinita players
Sanfrecce Hiroshima players
Sagan Tosu players
Nara Club players
Association football defenders